109 Squadron SAAF was initially established as 109 Air Commando. It was a Citizen Force squadron of the South African Air Force, established on 24 September 1963 at Mossel Bay. The unit was staffed by volunteer aircrew flying privately owned civilian aircraft. On 1 October 1968 control of 109 Air Commando was passed from the South African Army to the Air Force and the name was changed to 109 Squadron. The squadron stopped flying on 31 January 1993 and was disbanded on 31 March 1993. Its pilots were transferred to 105 and 108 Commando Squadrons.

Notes

References 

Squadrons of the South African Air Force
Military units and formations established in 1963
Military units and formations disestablished in 1993